Gabès Governorate is one of the 24 governorates of Tunisia and in south-eastern Tunisia. It covers an area of 7166 km2 and had a population of 374,300 as at the 2014 census. The capital is Gabès.

Geography
The governorate of Gabès is in southeast Tunisia on the coast of the Gulf of Gabès, 376 km south of the capital, Tunis.

Gabès has a hot Mediterranean climate. Gabès offers five contrasting landscapes: the beach, the mountains, the desert, small forest, oasis. It contains the eastern end of Chott el Fejej.

The coast is approximately half of that of the large bay.  The gulf has several alternative names dating to antiquity and to an etymological association with onshore winds and sandbanks making navigation difficult, including Lesser Syrtis (see Gulf of Sidra which takes in also the mainly Libyan portion of the continental gulf).

Administrative divisions
Administratively, the governorate is divided into ten delegations (mutamadiyat), ten municipalities, nine rural councils, and 73 sectors (imadas). The delegations and their populations from the 2004 and 2014 censuses, are listed below:

Ten municipalities are in Gabès Governorate:

Tourism
Matmata is a Berber-speaking town largely of underground homes conserved with a community-based pre-industrialized lifestyle. Eclectic souqs feature in the main municipalities, with traditional wood, stone, metal and textile products.

References

 
Governorates of Tunisia